The following is a list of ecoregions in Turkey as identified by the World Wide Fund for Nature (WWF).

Terrestrial
Turkey is in the Palearctic realm. Ecoregions are sorted by biome.

Temperate broadleaf and mixed forests
Balkan mixed forests (Bulgaria, Greece, North Macedonia, Romania, Serbia, Turkey)
Caucasus mixed forests (Armenia, Azerbaijan, Georgia, Russia, Turkey)
Central Anatolian deciduous forests (Turkey)
Eastern Anatolian deciduous forests (Turkey)
Euxine-Colchic deciduous forests (Georgia, Turkey, Bulgaria)
Zagros Mountains forest steppe (Iran, Iraq, Turkey)

Temperate coniferous forests
Northern Anatolian conifer and deciduous forests (Turkey)

Temperate grasslands, savannas and shrublands
Central Anatolian steppe (Turkey)
Eastern Anatolian montane steppe (Armenia, Iran, Turkey)

Mediterranean forests, woodlands, and scrub
Aegean and Western Turkey sclerophyllous and mixed forests (Greece, North Macedonia, Turkey)
Anatolian conifer and deciduous mixed forests  (Turkey)
Eastern Mediterranean conifer-sclerophyllous-broadleaf forests (Israel, Jordan, Lebanon, Palestine, Syria, Turkey)                                         
Southern Anatolian montane conifer and deciduous forests  (Israel, Jordan, Lebanon, Syria, Turkey)

Freshwater
 Central Anatolia
 Kura-South Caspian drainages
 Lake Van
 Northern Anatolia
 Orontes
 Southern Anatolia
 Thrace (freshwater)
 Upper Tigris and Euphrates
 Western Anatolia
 Western Transcaucasia

Marine
 Aegean Sea
 Black Sea
 Levantine Sea

References 
 Olson, D., Dinerstein, E., Canevari, P., Davidson, I., Castro, G., Morisset, V., Abell, R., and Toledo, E.; eds. (1998). Freshwater Biodiversity of Latin America and the Caribbean: A Conservation Assessment. Biodiversity Support Program, Washington DC.
 Ricketts, Taylor H., Eric Dinerstein, David M. Olson, Colby J. Loucks, et al. (1999). Terrestrial Ecoregions of North America: a Conservation Assessment. Island Press, Washington DC.
 Spalding, Mark D., Helen E. Fox, Gerald R. Allen, Nick Davidson et al. "Marine Ecoregions of the World: A Bioregionalization of Coastal and Shelf Areas". Bioscience Vol. 57 No. 7, July/August 2007, pp. 573–583.
 Thieme, Michelle L. (2005). Freshwater Ecoregions of Africa and Madagascar: A Conservation Assessment. Island Press, Washington DC.

 
Turkey
Ecoregions